, also known as , was an empress consort of Japan. She was the consort of Emperor Reigen.

Life
Her half-siblings by other mothers included the kampaku Takatsukasa Fusasuke, the sadaijin Kujō Kaneharu, and Takatsukasa Nobuko, the wife of Tokugawa Tsunayoshi. Another theory holds that Fusako was actually Norihira's younger sister, whom he adopted as his daughter.

Marriage
On December 1, 1670, Fusako entered the court of Emperor Reigen, one year her junior, as a court lady. On June 23, 1673, the palace went up in flames, and the estate of udaijin Konoe Motohiro was used as a temporary palace. This was not a new occurrence: in 1661, during the reign of the previous emperor Emperor Go-Sai, another conflagration had led to the use of Motohiro's estate. On October 3, 1673, Fusako gave birth to her daughter . In light of the great fire in Kyoto that had destroyed the palace, the era name was changed to Enpō. But on January 10, 1676, immediately after a new palace had been completed, the temporary one at Motohiro's estate caught flame in turn. Fusako and the emperor found refuge at the home of  before entering the new palace two days later.

Empress
On January 1, 1683, Fusako was proclaimed , and on December 3 she was invested as chūgū. She thereby became the emperor's legitimate wife—during the entire Edo period, this only happened four times. Reigen abdicated the throne on May 2, 1687, in favor of Crown Prince Asahito, who then became Emperor Higashiyama. Accompanying this, Fusako was bestowed the honorary name Shinjōsaimon-in. In early 1695, the shogunate presented her with 1,000 koku of land.

Takatsukasa Fusako died on May 19, 1712. Her grave is located at Tsuki no wa no misasagi in Higashiyama-ku, Kyoto.

Notes
All Western dates calculated using Tsuchihashi's database via the Nengocalc tool.

References

Japanese empresses
1653 births
1712 deaths
Fujiwara clan
People of Edo-period Japan
1680s in Japan
17th-century Japanese people